Karnak is a temple complex and a village near Luxor, Egypt.

Karnak or similar may also refer to:

Karnak
Karnak (band), from São Paulo, Brazil
Karnak (comics), an Inhuman in the Marvel Universe
Karnak, Illinois, a village in Pulaski County, Illinois, United States
Karnak (typeface), a typeface by R. Hunter Middleton
Karnak Mountain, Purcell Mountains, Canada
Karnak, Griggs County, North Dakota
Karnak, the Antarctic retreat of Ozymandias in the comic book series Before Watchmen: Ozymandias
Big Karnak, an arcade video game released in 1991 by Gaelco
Queen Karnak, a fictional character in the video game Final Fantasy V
S.S. Karnak, a fictional ship in the novel by Agatha Christie Death on the Nile
SS Karnak (1898), a French passenger ship

Carnac
Carnac, the village and commune in northwestern France
Carnac stones, a collection of monolithic sites around the village
Carnac the Magnificent, a recurring comedic role played by Johnny Carson on The Tonight Show Starring Johnny Carson
The Carnac and Rivett-Carnac families, including:
John Carnac (1716 – 29 November 1800), British Commander-in-Chief of India
James Rivett-Carnac (1784–1846), Commander-in-Chief of India
John Rivett-Carnac (1796–1869), Royal Navy admiral and explorer of Western Australia
Rivett-Carnac baronets
Carnac Island, a nature reserve near Fremantle, Western Australia
Carnac (The Silver Sequence), a fictional character in the book series The Silver Sequence
Rudolf Carnap (1891–1970), German philosopher

Other
Karnack, Texas, USA
KARNAC, Knowledge Aided Retrieval in Activity Context, terrorist profiling
Qaanaaq, a place in northwest Greenland

See also
Carnacki, a fictional occult detective created by William Hope